Palencia is a province of northern Spain, in the northern part of the autonomous community of Castile and León in the north of the Iberian Peninsula. It is bordered by the provinces of León, Cantabria, Burgos, and Valladolid.

Overview 

Of the population of 176,125 (2002), 45% live in the capital, Palencia which is located on the Canal de Castilla. There are 191 municipalities in the province, of which more than half are villages with fewer than 200 people. The major towns in this province are: Guardo, an industrial-mining town; Aguilar de Campoo, a biscuit and tourist village in northern Palencia; Herrera de Pisuerga, a village that is the gateway to the Palencine mountain, is also known for its summer activities and Crab Festival; Venta de Baños, an important railway and industrial junction south of the province; Villamuriel de Cerrato, a village to the south of Palencia that owes its development to the Renault factory and its proximity to Palencia; Cervera de Pisuerga, in the heart of the Palencine mountains; Barruelo, a mining town that was the most populated town until the 1960s. During the Middle Ages, the Visigoths ruled Palencia. Basílica de San Juan, the oldest Visigothic church in Spain, was built in 661 in the province's Baños de Cerrato. During the thirteenth century a university was founded in the province. It was the first university in Spain and one of the first in the world. It was later shifted to Valladolid.

The province is bordered on the north by Cantabria, on the west by the province of León, on the east by the province of Burgos and on the south by the province of Valladolid.

In Palencia large protected areas such as the Natural Park of Fuentes Carrionas and Fuente Cobre-Montaña Palencia are located. The term historical region in Palencia, refers to those regions created in the fourteenth century, under the name merindades. Cantabrian Mountains are located in the northerns parts of the province. The major commercial products produced in the province are barley, wheat, sugar beets, hemp, linen and woolen clothes, porcelain, leather, paper, and rugs. Food processing and metallurgy are major industries. The province has three judicial districts–one each in Palencia, Carrión de los Condes and Cervera de Pisuerga.

Population development
The historical population is given in the following chart:

See also 
 List of municipalities in Palencia
 The Arauz Formation is situated in Palencia (Devonian of Spain).

References

External links